Afetes is a village and a former municipality in Magnesia, Thessaly, Greece. Since the 2011 local government reform it is part of the municipality South Pelion, of which it is a municipal unit. The municipal unit has an area of 80.744 km2. Population 1,746 (2011). The seat of the municipality was in Neochori. Afetes is situated in the Pelion peninsula, 2 km from the Pagasetic Gulf coast, 4 km southwest of Neochori, 6 km northwest of Argalasti and 23 km southeast of Volos.

The name Afetes was taken from the ancient port Aphetae. The Persian fleet occupied the bay of Aphetae before the Battle of Artemisium, in 480 BC.

Subdivisions
The municipal unit Afetes is subdivided into the following communities (constituent villages in brackets):
Afetes (Afetes, Profitis Ilias)
Kalamaki
Lampinou
Neochori (Neochori, Agios Dimitrios, Afyssos, Zervochia, Megali Vrysi, Plaka)
Syki

Population

References

External links
 Afetes (municipality) on GTP Travel Pages
 Afetes (village) on GTP Travel Pages

See also
List of settlements in the Magnesia regional unit

Populated places in Pelion